Aquilino Duque Gimeno (January 6, 1931 – September 18, 2021) was a Spanish poet and writer. He received the National Literature Prize for Narrative in 1974.

References

1931 births
2021 deaths
Spanish poets
University of Seville alumni
Alumni of the University of Cambridge
Southern Methodist University alumni
People from Seville